14 Bagatelles, Sz.38, BB 50; 3rd Set, Op. 6 is a set of pieces for solo piano by Hungarian composer Béla Bartók, written in the spring of 1908 and first performed by the composer June 29, 1908, in Berlin. The work was published the following year in Budapest by Rozsnyai Károly. Composed the same year as Ten Easy Pieces, 14 Bagatelles was experimental and signified Bartók's departure from the tonality of 19th century composition. The work borders on atonality, and Bartók adopted some techniques of Debussy and Schoenberg.

Background
Bartók along with composer Zoltán Kodály had researched Hungarian folk music in 1905, and Bartók believed that the most interesting folk traditions in music existed in a multicultural environment with an active exchange of ideas between cultures. The first Bagatelle may reflect some of Bartók's view of multicultural folk music, with different key signatures for left and right hands.

During Bartók's study of folk music in Transylvania in 1907, he met and fell in love with Stefi Geyer, a 19 year old violinist who did not return his affection. Author Music critic for The New Yorker Alex Ross had suggested that Bartok's "fenced-off soul opening itself to the chaos of the outer world," and he attributed "rusty shards of folk melody" was a response to Geyer's rejection of Bartók.

Sections

See also
 List of solo piano compositions by Béla Bartók
 Bagatelle (music)
Ten Easy Pieces

References

External links
 

1908 compositions
Compositions for solo piano
Compositions by Béla Bartók